Ruidoso Downs is a horse racing track in Ruidoso Downs, New Mexico. The track hosts both Thoroughbred and Quarter Horse racing, notably the All American Futurity, the richest race in Quarter Horse racing.

It also hosts the Grade I All American Derby in early September, which carries a purse of $1,900,000 and was won in 2014 by the New Mexico-bred gelding Too Flash For You.

History

After a flood covered fields in gravel and silt in the small village of Ruidoso Downs, an informal race track was built on the fields in the 1940s. Bets varied from as "little as a bag of oats or $10,000 to $50,000 was being bet." A rodeo stand was moved from the village of Capitan, New Mexico to the field in 1945.  Arizona investor Eugene Hensley bought the racetrack in 1953, becoming its general manager. Over the next decade the facility would undergo a number of expansions, and around 1957, the All American Futurity was created by Hensley, Carl Mercer, and cowboy musician Ray Reed. Held at the racetrack on Labor Day starting in 1959, they added The Rainbow Futurity in 1964. In 1988 the majority of Ruidoso Downs Race Track was purchased by R.D. Hubbard. Though the track had fallen into disrepair, within a year Hubbard and a business partner invested several million dollars into improving the track. 1989 also saw the addition of simulcast racing and wagering, while Hubbard bought out Allred in 1991. Soon a sales pavilion and sports theatre were constructed, which is where the Ruidoso Select Yearling Sale is held. The facilities have also housed camel and ostrich races, as well as concerts by artists such as Toby Keith and Emilio Navaira. An adjacent casino was opened by the Hubbards in 1999. The 1937 Kentucky Derby trophy won by War Admiral is typically kept on display at Ruidoso Downs.

See also

Ruidoso Downs, New Mexico

References

External links

Official website for Ruidoso Downs Race Track
Village of Ruidoso Tourism Office

Horse racing venues in New Mexico
Tourist attractions in Lincoln County, New Mexico
Buildings and structures in Lincoln County, New Mexico
1940s establishments in New Mexico